The Barupė is a river of Jonava District Municipality and Kėdainiai District Municipality, Kaunas County, central Lithuania. It is a left tributary of the Nevėžis.

The Barupė river starts next to Žinėnai village, in Jonava District Municipality. It flows northwards, then in Pamelnytėlė turns to the west. It meets the Nevėžis next to Labūnava village.

The upper course in channalised. The lower course has a deep valley. A large Labūnava Reservoir is dammed on the Barupė river, also smaller ponds are located on the Barupė valley in Kuigaliai and Labūnava.  

Sangailiškiai, Kuigaliai, Pėdžiai, Nociūnai, Serbinai, Labūnava villages are located on the shores of the Barupė. A part of river's lower course is protected as the Barupė Landscape Sanctuary. 

The hydronym is of uncertain origin. The component upė means 'river' while the root bar- could be of archaic origin, related to  'puddle',  'slough between hills', Illyrian languages: *bar(b)- 'puddle'.

References

Rivers of Lithuania
Kėdainiai District Municipality
Jonava District Municipality